Lepidotarphius is a monotypic genus of moths in the family Glyphipterigidae described by Pryer in 1877. Its single species, Lepidotarphius perornatella, was described by Francis Walker in 1864. It is found in China and the Russian Far East.

The larvae have been recorded feeding on Acorus calamus var. asiaticus.

Subspecies
Lepidotarphius perornatella perornatellus (Kiangsu, Chekiang, northern Yunnan, Kwangtung)
Lepidotarphius perornatella fulgens (Erschoff, 1877) (Amur, Ussuri)

References

Moths described in 1864
Glyphipterigidae
Moths of Japan
Monotypic moth genera